All That Remains is a 2005 release by Circle II Circle. This was an EP distributed by AFM Records to demonstrate to fans the new line-up of the band that debuted on the resulting studio album, The Middle of Nowhere, which was released later in 2005. The EP featured two songs which would feature on that album (including the title track), two new tracks, and an edit of the title track.

Track listing 
 "All That Remains" (Single Edit) - 3:53
 "In This Life" - 5:46
 "Strung Out" - 5:29
 "Shadows" - 4:52
 "All That Remains" (Album Version) - 5:18

Personnel 
 Zachary Stevens – lead vocals, keyboards
 Evan Christopher – guitars
 Andrew Lee - guitars
 Mitch Stewart – bass guitar
 Tom Drennan – drums

References 

2005 EPs
Circle II Circle albums
AFM Records EPs